The Hawke Castle is a historic residence in Modesto, California built in the Norman style in 1929. The home was occupied by Mr. Edward Hawke, who was manager of the Modesto J. C. Penney store at the time. After his death, Mrs. Hawke sold it to engineer Al Goldschmidt and his wife schoolteacher Dorothea Goldschmidt. Next came Dr. Burnett Tonge and wife, Bertha. The house is now property of the Thayer Family Trust. The residence has six bedrooms and four bathrooms, fully designed living area in basement and attic.

References

Buildings and structures in Modesto, California
Houses completed in 1929
Neo-Norman architecture in the United States
Houses in Stanislaus County, California